Ranipur is a town and a Nagar Panchayat (14 wards members) in Jhansi district in the Indian state of Uttar Pradesh.

Geography
It has an average elevation of 205 metres (672 feet).

Demographics
As of the 2001 Census of India, Ranipur had a population of 18,029. Males constitute 53% of the population, and females make up 47%. Ranipur has an average literacy rate of 59%, lower than the national average of 59.5%: male literacy is 70%, and female literacy is 45%. In Ranipur, 16% of the population is under 6 years of age. The politics of this town is a barrier to the development of this town. For many years there is no sign of development has been found in this town. The town is waiting for a regeneration of Ranipur as a handloom and a textile city. Jal Vihar Festival is organized here every year. Bihari Lal Arya, former minister of UP state, also belongs to Ranipur.

References

College- Shri shivlal mahavidhyalaya, shri sant siromani kabir saheb mahavidhyalaya

Schools-
Mhaveer jain inter college,
Gyandeep junior high
 school,
Indian public school,
Mothers pride,
Happy school,
Gyan sthali,
Sraswati vidhya mandir.
Ganeshi bai junior high secondary school.
Parks-
Rani laxmi bai park.( always closed )

Banks-
State bank of india,
Corporation bank,
HDFC bank,
Gramin bank.

Cities and towns in Hisar district